Avaste Airfield was an airfield in Avaste, Rapla County, Estonia.

The airfield was built during 1975-1985 by Soviet Union. The airfield was used for agricultural activities.

References

External links
 Avaste Airfield at Forgotten Airfields

Defunct airports in Estonia
Buildings and structures in Rapla County